Busy Girls is a 1930 German silent drama film directed by Erich Schönfelder and starring Lien Deyers, Ivan Koval-Samborsky and Elza Temary.

The film's sets were designed by the art directors Gustav A. Knauer and Willy Schiller. Made in 1929 and released at the beginning of 1930, it was in the tail-end of the silent era which was rapidly being replaced by the arrival of sound.

Cast
Lien Deyers
Ivan Koval-Samborsky
Elza Temary
Toni Tetzlaff
Aruth Wartan
Raimondo Van Riel
Olga Limburg
Robert Garrison

References

External links

Films of the Weimar Republic
German silent feature films
Films directed by Erich Schönfelder
1930 drama films
German drama films
German black-and-white films
Silent drama films
1930s German films
1930s English-language films